Events from the year 1721 in Scotland.

Incumbents 

 Secretary of State for Scotland: John Ker, 1st Duke of Roxburghe

Law officers 
 Lord Advocate – Robert Dundas
 Solicitor General for Scotland – Walter Stewart; then John Sinclair and Charles Binning

Judiciary 
 Lord President of the Court of Session – Lord North Berwick
 Lord Justice General – Lord Ilay (also this year appointed Keeper of the Privy Seal of Scotland)
 Lord Justice Clerk – Lord Grange

Events 
 Battle of Glen Affric: Men of the Jacobite Clan Mackenzie and Clan Macrae ambush men of the pro-Hanoverian Clan Ross led by William Ross, 6th of Easter Fearn (who is fatally wounded) when he attempts to collect rents (forfeit to the crown) on the Mackenzie estates.
 Battle of Coille Bhan: British Army troops of Colonel Kirk's Regiment under Captain McNeill drive off an attack from the Clan Mackenzie but again fail to collect rents on their estates.
 Ruthven Barracks completed.
 Chandos Chair of Medicine and Anatomy established at the University of St Andrews.
 Robert Wodrow publishes The History of the Sufferings of the Church of Scotland.

Births 
 21 January – James Murray, military officer and colonial administrator (died 1794)
 5 March – John Adam, architect (died 1792)
 19 March (baptized) – Tobias Smollett, novelist (died 1771 in Tuscany)
 24 June – Francis Garden, Lord Gardenstone, judge (died 1793)
 14 July – John Douglas, Anglican bishop of Salisbury and man of letters (died 1807 in England)
 19 September – William Robertson, historian and Principal of the University of Edinburgh (died 1793)
 3 October – John Skinner, Episcopalian minister, historian, poet and songwriter (died 1807)
 5 October – William Wilkie, Presbyterian minister, natural philosopher and poet (died 1772)
 6 December – James Elphinston, philologist (died 1809 in England)
 Earliest likely date – James Grainger, physician, poet and translator (died 1766 in the West Indies)

Deaths 
 14 January – William Johnstone, 1st Marquess of Annandale (born 1664)
 13 December – Alexander Selkirk, sailor and castaway (born 1676; died at sea)

See also 

 Timeline of Scottish history

References 

 
Years of the 18th century in Scotland
Scotland
1720s in Scotland